The list of Liberty University people includes notable graduates, professors, honorary degree recipients, and other people affiliated with Liberty University.

Founders
 Jerry Falwell, founder
 Elmer Towns, founder

Administration
 Jerry Prevo, Former president of Liberty University

Alumni

Academics
 Tracy Packiam Alloway, cognitive psychology instructor at University of North Florida
 Susan Wise Bauer, author and English instructor at The College of William & Mary
 Tony Campbell political science instructor at Towson University
 Dondi E. Costin, President of Charleston Southern University
 Paul H. Dixon, President of Cedarville University 
 Joe Hale, founder of Network of International Christian Schools
 Alex McFarland, Director of Christian World View at North Greenville University

Business
 Patrick Ayota, Ugandan businessman, Deputy Managing Director of the National Social Security Fund of Uganda

Film
 Richard Rossi, filmmaker, actor, evangelist.
 Laurie Bartram, actress.

Journalism
 Shannon Bream, Fox News host
 Jessica Moore, American journalist at WCBS-TV
 Samantha Ponder, ESPN host
 Kevin Roose, Reporter for the New York Times, attended for a semester

Literature
 Angela Elwell Hunt, Christian author
 Tim LaHaye, Christian author
 Daniel Whyte III, Christian author

Music
 Meredith Andrews, contemporary Christian music singer
 Hector Cervantes, member of Casting Crowns
 Stephen Christian, lead singer for Anberlin
 Thad Cockrell, Christian country singer
 Anthony Evans, Jr., Christian singer-songwriter
 Terry Fator, singer and ventriloquist
 Chad Graham, member of Christian rock band Anthem Lights
 Caleb Grimm, member of Christian rock band Anthem Lights
 Corey Horn, bassist for Christian rock band Remedy Drive
 Paris Jones, singer and rapper
 Kyle Kupecky, former member of Christian rock band Anthem Lights
 Tim Lambesis, former founding member of As I Lay Dying
 Joy Lippard, Contemporary Christian music singer
 Mark Lowry, Christian singer and comedian
 Kevin Max, singer for Christian group Audio Adrenaline; former member of Christian rock band DC Talk
 Jody McBrayer, former singer for Christian group Avalon
 Nightbirde, former contestant on America's Got Talent
 Guy Penrod, former singer for gospel group Gaither Vocal Band
 Alan Powell, member of Christian rock band Anthem Lights
 Jon Schneck, member of Christian rock band Relient K
 Phil Stacey, contestant on the sixth season of American Idol
 Michael Tait, lead singer for Christian group Newsboys; former member of DC Talk
 Shaun Tomczak, member of the band Sidewalk Prophets
 TobyMac, Christian hip hop artist; former member of DC Talk
 The Lone Bellow, Brian Elmquist and Zach Williams both attended in the early 2000s

Other
 Tad Skylar Agoglia, founder of First Response Team of America
 Kevin Beary, former sheriff of Orange County, Florida
 Jurnee Carr, founder of Jurnee's Journey Foundation
 Chris Epps, convicted former commissioner of the Mississippi Department of Corrections (MDOC)
 Courtney Garrett, Miss Virginia
 Murray A. Hansen, Wisconsin Air National Guard General
 Victoria Henley, Model appeared on America's Next Top Model
Michael Beckner Police Chief Southeastern Louisiana University

Politics
 Les Adams, Republican member of the Virginia House of Delegates
 Wendell Walker, Republican member of the Virginia House of Delegates
 Mike Cherry, Republican member of the Virginia House of Delegates
 Will Wampler, Republican member of the Virginia House of Delegates
 Chuck Baldwin, Constitution Party presidential nominee in the 2008 US presidential election
 Allison Ball, Kentucky State Treasurer
 Scott Baugh, former Republican member of the California State Assembly
 Ken Borton, Republican serving Michigan House of Representatives from the 105th district.
 Fernando Cabrera,  Democratic Council member in New York
 Lee Chatfield, Republican member of the Michigan House of Representatives
 Jeff Coleman, former Republican member of the Pennsylvania House of Representatives
 Mike Fleck, Republican member of the Pennsylvania House of Representatives
 Kevin Grantham, Republican, President of the Colorado Senate
 Pete Kelly, Republican, President of the Alaska Senate
 Janet Vestal Kelly, former Secretary of the Commonwealth of Virginia
 Tim Krieger, Republican member of the Pennsylvania House of Representatives
 Jean Elizabeth Manes, United States Ambassador to El Salvador
 Chad Mayes, California politician serving the  California State Assembly
 Tony Perkins, President of the Family Research Council; former Republican member of the Louisiana House of Representatives
 Mats Persson, director of Open Europe
 Jena Powell former member of Ohio House of Representatives
 John O'Neal,  Republican member of the West Virginia House of Delegates
 Adrian Smith, US Congressman from Nebraska (transferred to the University of Nebraska)
 Jeffrey Thompson, member of the Idaho House of Representatives
 Jennifer Sullivan Republican member of the Florida House of Representatives
 Jackie Walorski, Republican member of the United States House of Representatives
 Bob Good, Republican member of the United States House of Representatives

Religion
 Jonathan Falwell, son of Jerry Falwell and senior pastor of Thomas Road Baptist Church
 William Franklin Graham IV, evangelist; grandson of Billy Graham
 Jerry Johnston, honorary Doctor of Divinity: founding pastor of the former First Family Church of Overland Park, Kansas; now vice president of Houston Baptist University
 Michael R. Licona, Christian New Testament scholar and apologist;  Professor of Theology
 Gabe Lyons, founder, Fermi Project
 Johnnie Moore, Jr., author and CEO of The Kairos Company
 Ed Stetzer, Christian author and missionary
 Chris Surber, pastor and author
 Bill Keller, televangelist and host of Live Prayer

Science
 David A. Schauer, former executive director of National Council on Radiation Protection and Measurements

Sports

Baseball
 Tony Beasley, manager of the Syracuse Chiefs
 Doug Brady, former second baseman for the Chicago White Sox
 Sid Bream, former MLB first baseman
 David Bote, outfielder for Chicago Cubs transferred out after one semester 
 Ryan Cordell, outfielder for Milwaukee Brewers
 Rod Delmonico, former coach for the University of Tennessee and the Dutch national team
 Lee Guetterman, former MLB pitcher
 Ian Parmley, outfielder for Toronto Blue Jays
 Randy Tomlin, pitching coach for the Harrisburg Senators

Basketball
 Peter Aluma, former center for the Nigerian national team
 Seth Curry, guard for the Dallas Mavericks
 Tomasz Gielo,  forward for the Joventut Badalona and the Poland national basketball team
 Octavio De La Grana, assistant coach and head scout for the Miami Heat
 Katie Feenstra-Mattera, former WNBA player, head coach of the Cornerstone University women's team
 Megan Frazee, forward for CCC Polkowice in Poland, former WNBA player
Scottie James (born 1996), basketball player for Hapoel Haifa in the Israeli Basketball Premier League
 Julius Nwosu, former NBA player
 Jeri Porter, former head coach of the George Mason University women's team
 Jesse Sanders, guard for S.L. Benfica
 Andrew Smith, forward for Rasta Vechta and member of the Latvia national basketball team
 Itoro Umoh-Coleman, former head coach of the Clemson University women's team
 Avery Warley, former center for the Phoenix Mercury

Football
 Walt Aikens, defensive back for the Miami Dolphins
 Fred Banks, former wide receiver for the Cleveland Browns, Miami Dolphins, and Chicago Bears
 Sebastian Barrie, former defensive end and tackle for the Green Bay Packers, Arizona Cardinals, and San Diego Chargers
 Elijah Benton defensive back for the Cleveland Browns
 Mike Brown, former wide receiver for the Carolina Panthers
 Dwayne Carswell, former tight end and offensive lineman for the Denver Broncos
 John Cartwright, former Liberty coach
 Kelvin Edwards, former wide receiver for the New Orleans Saints and Dallas Cowboys
 Jason Elam, former Kicker for the Denver Broncos
 Marcus Floyd, former cornerback for the New York Jets, Buffalo Bills, and Carolina Panthers
 Nick Foles, quarterback for the Philadelphia Eagles, Super Bowl LII MVP.
 Samkon Gado, former NFL running back
 Antonio Gandy-Golden former wide receiver for the Washington Football Team
 Eric Green, former NFL tight end
 Wayne Haddix, former defensive end for the New York Giants, Tampa Bay Buccaneers, and Carolina Panthers
 Erick Harris, former NFL and arena football defensive end
 Rashad Jennings, former NFL running back
 Dominique Jones, tight end for the Indianapolis Colts
 Jennifer King, First black woman coach, assistant running backs coach for the Washington Football Team
 Kevin Fogg, defensive back for the Winnipeg Blue Bombers
 Matt Lambros, CFL free agent
 Jessie Lemonier current defensive end for the. Los Angeles Chargers
 Mike Lucas, football coach for the University of Louisiana at Lafayette
 T.J. McCreight, former coach and current player personnel executive with the Philadelphia Eagles
 James McKnight, former wide receiver for the Seattle Seahawks, Dallas Cowboys, and Miami Dolphins; coach at Cypress Bay High School
 Vince Redd, NFL free agent
 Stephen Sene, former offensive tackle for the New England Patriots
 Rocky Seto, former NFL coach
 Vic Shealy, head coach at Houston Baptist University
 Hunter Steward, offensive lineman for the BC Lions
 Richard Shelton, scout for the Tennessee Titans
 Johnny Shepherd, former running back for the Hamilton Tiger-Cats, Buffalo Bills, and New York Knights
 Donald Smith, former CFL cornerback and All-star
 Chris Summers, former wide receiver for the Minnesota Vikings
 Malik Willis, Former quarterback for the Liberty Flames
 Paul Troth, former assistant football coach at ECU
 Brian Witherspoon, former New York Giant
 Josh Woodrum, former quarterback for the Baltimore Ravens

Soccer
 Darren Amoo, forward for the Pittsburgh Riverhounds
 Willie Bell, former coach and Leeds United forward 
 Joshua Boateng, midfielder for AC Oulu in Finland
 Coy Craft, midfielder for the FC Dallas
 Gabrielle Farrell forward for the Jamaica women's national football team
 Juan Guzman, midfielder for the Charlotte Eagles
 Kevin Mendoza forward for the Tampa Bay Rowdies
 Tresor Mbuyu forward for the Charlotte Independence
 Darryl Roberts, striker for the Charlotte Eagles and the Trinidad and Tobago national team
 Osei Telesford, midfielder for the Puerto Rico Islanders and the Trinidad and Tobago national team
 Sly Tetteh, former president of Liberty Professionals in Ghana

Other sports
 Michael Andrew, Olympic swimmer represents United States
 Marc-André Bourdon, former defenseman for the Philadelphia Flyers
 William Byron, NASCAR Driver
 Joaquín Ballivián, Chilean shot putter
 Sam Chelanga, professional runner
 Josh Cox, long-distance runner
 Charles Fernandez, Olympic pentathlete that represents Guatemala
 Jhon Perlaza, track and field olympian from Colombia  
 Elena Seiple, bodybuilder
 Tuffield Latour, US men's bobsled coach
 Debbie Yow, Athletic Director at NC State

Television
 Patricia Abravanel, daughter of Silvio Santos, Brazilian TV producer and host
 Jean Doumanian, television producer
 Tiffany Espensen, actress known for Piper Nickelodeon Bucket & Skinner's Epic Adventures
 Trent Garrett, actor and model
 Vic Mignogna, anime voice actor
 Heidi Mueller, soap opera actress
 Lindsley Register, actress, producer and writer best known for her role as Laura on The Walking Dead, and as Dharma on Six
 Phil Snyder, voice actor known for Disney Jiminy Cricket

Faculty and staff
 Dave Brat, economist and politician, Dean of Business 
 Charles Billingsley, former worship leader at Thomas Road Baptist Church
 James A. Borland, professor of philosophy and theology
 Hugh Freeze Head Coach 
 Carey Green, head women's basketball coach
 Dan Gordon, visiting professor of cinematic arts
 Gary Habermas, chairman of the department of philosophy and theology
 Michael S. Heiser, professor of theology 
 Mark Horstemeyer, Distinguished professor and Dean of Engineering 
 Ed Hindson, professor of Old Testament studies and eschatology, host of The King Is Coming
 Robert Hurt, Dean of School of Law and Government
 Thomas Ice, former executive director of the Pre-Trib Research Center, associate professor of theology
 Rachel Johnson, professional runner and track and field coach
 Phill Kline, professor of law
 Karen Kingsbury, visiting professor of English (received Honorary Doctor of Letters in 2017)
 Babbie Mason, The School of Music Advisory Council member
 Ritchie McKay, head basketball coach
 Ian McCaw, athletic director
 Ricky Skaggs, The School of Music Advisory Council member
 Michael W. Smith visiting instructor for Liberty school of music
 Dot Richardson, head softball coach
 Randall Wallace, visiting professor of cinematic arts

Honorary Degree recipients
 George H. W. Bush, former 41st President of the United States of America. Honorary Doctor of Humanities awarded in 1990.
 Shannon Bream, Journalist on Fox News . Honorary Doctor of Law awarded in 2013.
 Jeb Bush, former 43rd Governor of Florida. Honorary Doctor of Humanities awarded in 2015.
 S. Truett Cathy, founder of Chick-fil-A. Honorary Doctor of Humanities awarded in 2012.
 Ben Carson, Neurosurgeon and current United States Secretary of Housing and Urban Development . Honorary Doctor of Sciences awarded in 2018.
 Jimmy Carter, 39th President of the United States . Honorary Doctor of Humanities awarded in 2018.
 Rashad Jennings, former New York Giants running back. Honorary Doctor of Humanities awarded in 2016.
Mike Lindell, businessman and founder and CEO of My Pillow, Inc. Honorary Doctorate of Business awarded in 2019.
 Chuck Norris, Actor. Honorary Doctor of Humanities awarded in 2008.
 Lacey E. Putney, former member of the Virginia House of Delegates. Honorary Doctor of Humanities award in 2014 
 Mitt Romney, former Governor of Massachusetts. Honorary Doctor of Humanities awarded in 2012 
 Tim Tebow, current Jacksonville Jaguars Tight End. Honorary Doctor of Humanities awarded in 2021
 Donald Trump, businessman and 45th President of the United States. Honorary Doctorate of Business awarded in 2012. Honorary Doctor of Laws in 2017, awarded during his first college commencement speech as President.
 Randall Wallace, screenwriter known for Braveheart.  Honorary Doctor of Humanities award in 2011.

References

Liberty University people